TPM may refer to:

Organisations 
 The Pentecostal Mission, a Pentecostal religious denomination in Tamil Nadu, India
 Australian Securities Exchange symbol for TPG Telecom

Publishing
 The Philosophers' Magazine, an independent quarterly magazine
 Talking Points Memo, a political blog run by Joshua Marshall

Science and technology
 Tethered particle motion, a biophysical single-molecule experiment method
 Technical program manager, a product manager with a background or a focus on engineering
 Transcripts per million, a measure of gene expression in RNA-Seq.

Computing
 Trusted Platform Module, a specification for a secure cryptoprocessor included with some computers
 Tivoli Provisioning Manager, a software product by IBM
 Trade promotion management, software that supports the management of trade promotion
 Technical protection measures, another name for digital rights management

Other uses
 Technical performance measure,  a term used by the US military for key technical goals
 Total productive maintenance, an equipment maintenance program
 Technology Park Malaysia, a research and development centre
 T. P. M. Mohideen Khan (born 1947), Minister for Environment in the Tamil Nadu state of India

See also
 Star Wars: Episode I – The Phantom Menace, an episode in the Star Wars saga